James Benjamin Scowcroft (born 15 November 1975) is a retired footballer who played as a striker. He is currently a coach for the Ipswich Town academy.

Scowcroft began his career at Ipswich Town, graduating from the club's academy. He went on to score over 50 goals and make over 200 appearances for Ipswich, helping the club win promotion to the Premier League in 2000. He joined Leicester City in 2001, spending four seasons at the club, including helping the club return to the Premier League in 2003. He returned to Ipswich on loan during the 2004–05 season before joining Coventry City in 2005. He spent one season at Coventry before leaving to join Crystal Palace in 2006. He spent three seasons at Crystal Palace. In 2009 he joined Leyton Orient, spending one season with the club. After his release from Leyton Orient in 2010, Scowcroft joined hometown club Bury Town.

He won five caps for the England U21 national team between 1996–1997.

Club career
Born in Bury St Edmunds, Suffolk, Scowcroft started his career as a youth player at nearby Ipswich Town, joining the club at the age of 11. He progressed to become a regular first team player, gaining five England Under-21 caps in the process. From 1994 to 2001 he played over 200 games for the club, scoring over 50 goals. He was named player's and fan's Player of the Year in 2000 but missed out on the play off final with a hamstring injury, which saw Ipswich promoted to the Premier League. At the end of the 2000–01 season, he was sold to Leicester City for £3m, where he played over 150 games, scoring fewer than 30 goals. During his period at Leicester Scowcroft was accused of being involved in the alleged sexual assault of three women at La Manga golf club, Spain, but was cleared of all charges, having been mistakenly identified. He was loaned back to Ipswich in the spring of 2005.

Scowcroft was then signed by Coventry City on a free transfer. He was used primarily on the right sometimes as the right wing for Coventry for the 2005–06 season.
He left Coventry City to join Crystal Palace for £500,000 in July 2006. He was released by the club in May 2009 having made a total of 86 senior appearances scoring 14 times. He then joined Leyton Orient but after fitness problems and failing to score a goal in 20 games for Orient, he was released a year later.

In September 2010, Scowcroft joined non-league hometown club, Bury Town, signing a "pay-as-you-play" deal.
He made his debut as a substitute in an away game against Wealdstone later the same month. In January 2012 Bury Town announced Scowcroft's retirement from football, having failed to recover from an injury sustained during a pre-season friendly.

Career statistics

Honours
Ipswich Town
Football League First Division play-offs: 2000

Leicester City
Football League First Division runner-up: 2002–03

Individual
Nationwide Player of the Month: December 1999
Ipswich Town Player of the season: 1999–2000
Leicester City Goal of the season: 2001–02
Crystal Palace Goal of the Season: 2007–08

References

External links
James Scowcroft player profile at cpfc.co.uk
James Scowcroft player profile at lcfc.com

1975 births
Living people
Sportspeople from Bury St Edmunds
English footballers
England under-21 international footballers
Association football forwards
Ipswich Town F.C. players
Leicester City F.C. players
Coventry City F.C. players
Crystal Palace F.C. players
Leyton Orient F.C. players
Bury Town F.C. players
English Football League players
Premier League players
Isthmian League players